The 2020 Silverstone FIA Formula 3 round is a motor racing event held on 1 and 2 August 2020 at the Silverstone Circuit, Towcester, United Kingdom. It was the fourth round of the 2020 FIA Formula 3 Championship, and ran in support of the 2020 British Grand Prix.

Entries 
Enaam Ahmed left Carlin Buzz Racing due to sponsorship reasons, which caused Ben Barnicoat to make an unexpected return to single-seaters.

Classification

Qualifying 
The Qualifying session took place on 31 July 2020, with Logan Sargeant scoring his first pole position in Formula 3.

Feature Race 

 Notes：

  - Max Fewtrell was given a three-place grid drop for Race 2 for causing a collision with Olli Caldwell.
  - Matteo Nannini was given a five-second penalty for exceeding the minimum delta time in three marshalling sectors while under safety car conditions.

Sprint Race 

 Notes：

  - Aleksandr Smolyar originally won the race but was penalised for changing direction down the straight between corners 14 and 15, in order to break the tow between himself and Beckmann in P2.
  - Sophia Flörsch was handed a five-second time penalty for forcing Cameron Das off the track.

Standings after the event 

Drivers' Championship standings

Teams' Championship standings

 Note: Only the top five positions are included for both sets of standings.

See also 

 2020 British Grand Prix
 2020 Silverstone Formula 2 round

References

External links 
Official website

|- style="text-align:center"
|width="35%"|Previous race:
|width="30%"|FIA Formula 3 Championship2020 season
|width="40%"|Next race:

Silverstone Circuit
2020 in British sport
2020 in British motorsport